Tmesisternus ludificator is a species of beetle in the family Cerambycidae. It was described by Karl Borromaeus Maria Josef Heller in 1914, originally under the genus Arrhenotus.

References

ludificator
Beetles described in 1914